Clarence Valley Regional Airport  also known as Grafton Airport, is an airport  southeast of Grafton, New South Wales, Australia. The airport is used by the NSW Air Ambulance Service, Royal Flying Doctor Service, LifeFlight, Westpac Life Saver Rescue Helicopter Service, and community service flights such as Angel Flight and Little Wings.

The airport was formerly served by 24 weekly services to Sydney operated by Rex Airlines which ended in June 2022.

During the warmer spring and summer months, Grafton Airport is frequently used as a base for aircraft engaged in aerial firefighting by the NSW Rural Fire Service which has an established aviation branch at the airport.

In 2013, the Clarence Valley Council, which operates the airport, secured $2.12 million funding through loans and grants to upgrade the facilities at the airport.

See also
List of airports in New South Wales

References

External links
 

Airports in New South Wales